Zhang Zhihao (born 2 January 2001) is a Chinese footballer currently playing as a defender for Jiangxi Dark Horse Junior, on loan from Guangzhou.

Career statistics

Club
.

Notes

References

2001 births
Living people
Chinese footballers
Association football defenders
China League One players
China League Two players
Villarreal CF players
Guangzhou F.C. players
Beijing Sport University F.C. players
Chinese expatriate footballers
Chinese expatriate sportspeople in Spain
Expatriate footballers in Spain